Christopher Mark Burke (born 1965) is a Church of England priest; he is the Archdeacon of Barking.

Education and family
Burke graduated from Coventry Polytechnic with a Bachelor of Laws (LLB) in 1987 and began training for the ministry at Ripon College Cuddesdon in 1989. He later gained a Master of Arts (MA) from Heythrop College, London in 2006. He married Helen, a general practitioner, and they have two children.

Ministry
Burke was made deacon at Petertide 1992 (5 July) by John Habgood, Archbishop of York, at York Minster and ordained a priest the Petertide following (5 July 1993) by Gordon Bates, Bishop of Whitby, at St Mary's Church, Nunthorpe (his title). He served his curacy in Nunthorpe (1992–1996) before becoming Vicar of South Bank, York until 2002 and then Rector of St Dunstan's, Stepney (East London).

On 12 September 2010, he was installed a Canon Residentiary of Sheffield Cathedral and served as "Canon for Learning and Development" until 2013, when, remaining a Canon Residentiary, he took the role of Precentor; he additionally become Vice-Dean in 2014. On 16 December 2018, it was announced that Burke is to serve as Archdeacon of Barking in the Diocese of Chelmsford: his collation at Chelmsford Cathedral is scheduled for 12 May 2019.

References

Archdeacons of Barking
Living people
1965 births